Hart Bennett (1 April 1906 – 8 December 1969) was a South African cricketer. He played in three first-class matches for Eastern Province from 1924/25 to 1926/27.

See also
 List of Eastern Province representative cricketers

References

External links
 

1906 births
1969 deaths
South African cricketers
Eastern Province cricketers